Windsor Lodge may refer to:

Cumberland Lodge, also known as "Windsor Lodge", country house in Windsor Great Park south of Windsor Castle, England
William E. Borah Apartment, Windsor Lodge, in Washington, D.C., listed on the National Register of Historic Places, also or perhaps primarily known as "Windsor Lodge"